Jared Wade Fernandez (born February 2, 1972) is an Hispanic American former Major League Baseball knuckleball pitcher who last pitched in  for the Hiroshima Toyo Carp of Japan's Central League.

He played in their organization until , when he was signed by the Cincinnati Reds to a minor league contract. He made his major league debut with the Reds on September 19, .

He spent 2001 and  bouncing up and down between the Reds' Triple-A team, Louisville, and the major league team. In December 2002, he was signed by the Houston Astros after he filed for free agency.

In , he spent the season in the minors with the Scranton/Wilkes-Barre Red Barons, in the Phillies organization.

In , Fernandez was signed by the Milwaukee Brewers and won a bullpen spot out of spring training. After a few bad outings he was sent down to the Triple-A Nashville Sounds. In the 2006 offseason, he was a pitcher for the Dominican team, Aguilas Cibaeñas, where he was subsequently released in midseason.

On December 11, 2006, Fernandez signed a one-year, $200,000 contract with the Hiroshima Carp of Japan.

Honors and awards
In 1994, he was a Western Athletic Conference All-Star.

See also

List of knuckleball pitchers

External links

Minor League Splits and Situational Stats

1972 births
Living people
Major League Baseball pitchers
Baseball players from Utah
Cincinnati Reds players
Houston Astros players
Milwaukee Brewers players
American expatriate baseball players in Japan
Hiroshima Toyo Carp players
Pawtucket Red Sox players
Louisville Bats players
New Orleans Zephyrs players
Nashville Sounds players
Águilas Cibaeñas players
American expatriate baseball players in the Dominican Republic
Knuckleball pitchers
Fresno State Bulldogs baseball players
American expatriate baseball players in Australia
Scranton/Wilkes-Barre Red Barons players
Trenton Thunder players
Utica Blue Sox players